Jacobs bogies (named after Wilhelm Jakobs,, 1858–1942, a German mechanical railway engineer) are a type of rail vehicle bogie commonly found on articulated railcars and tramway vehicles.

Instead of being underneath a piece of rolling stock, Jacobs bogies are placed between two carriages. The weight of each carriage is spread across the Jacobs bogie. This arrangement provides the smooth ride of bogie carriages without the additional weight and drag.

Some Talgo trains use modified Jacobs bogies, that only use two wheels, and the wheels are allowed to spin independently of each other, eliminating hunting oscillation.

Background

The first fast train using this type of bogie was the German Fliegender Hamburger in 1932. In the United States, such configurations were used throughout the twentieth century with some success on early streamlined passenger trainsets, such as the Pioneer Zephyr in 1934, various Southern Pacific Daylight articulated cars, and Union Pacific Railroad's M-10000. Dallas Area Rapid Transit rail trains originally used a center bogie in a two-car unit but these have been modified to add a lower center section for handicapped level entry making a 3-car unit with two Jacobs bogies.

Vehicles featuring Jacobs bogies include the Alstom-made TGV, KTX-I, KTX-Sancheon and Class 373 High speed trains, the Bombardier Talent series of multiple units, the LINT41, the Class 423 S-Bahn vehicles, the Canadian CN Turbo-Trains, several FLIRT trains, IC3 by Adtranz, the JR Central L0 Series maglev and the Škoda ForCity tram.

In Australia, Jacobs bogies were first used in 1984–85 on B class Melbourne trams, which were designed to run on two former suburban railways which had been converted to light rail operation.

Not a Jacobs bogie 

A number of intermodal freight trains, such as the Pacer Stacktrain run by US logistics company XPO Logistics, use container well cars joined in groups of three to five, with four side bearings  on top of the bolster of a standard North American bogie between the individual cars.

Locomotives
Some triple-bogied two-section electric locomotives such as the NZR EW class have an articulated body supported on the centre bogie.  Other types of Bo-Bo-Bo locomotives instead use a body shell that has enough allowance for sideplay in the central bogie.

Tram (streetcar) 
The Jacobs bogie can be found in trams (streetcars) such as the Tatra K2 and Oslo's SL79. The first 100% low floor tram with pivoting bogies, the Škoda ForCity, also uses modified Jacobs bogies.

US interurban trains

On this crossover between the tram (streetcar) and the high-speed train, Jacobs bogies occurred on the latest equipment of any significance, the two Electroliner trains (1941–1976). They served the Chicago–Milwaukee line and later the Philadelphia area.

Advantages
Safety, because the trains are less prone to collapse like an accordion after derailing. A Eurostar train has been recorded as having derailed at a speed close to 300 km/h with no resultant loss of life or severe injuries among its passengers.
Lower weight and simpler and cheaper construction because bogies are heavy, expensive, and complex structures.
Less rail squeal and other wheel-to-rail noise because of fewer bogies.

Disadvantages
The cars of the vehicle/unit are semi-permanently coupled and  can only be separated in the workshop. However, some flexibility may be achieved by coupling two or three units together into one train.
Fewer bogies and fewer wheelsets mean greater axle loads – if everything else is equal.

Gallery

References

Bogie